"By the Time This Night Is Over" is a song by American musician Kenny G and singer-songwriter Peabo Bryson, released as a single from Kenny G's sixth studio album, Breathless, in 1993 and on Bryson's 16th studio album, Through the Fire, in 1994. The song peaked at number 25 on the US Billboard Hot 100 chart and number 37 on the Billboard Hot R&B Singles. On the Hot Adult Contemporary Tracks chart, "By the Time This Night Is Over" spent two weeks at number one, while in Canada, the song reached number six on the RPM Top Singles chart and number one on the RPM Adult Contemporary chart.

Personnel
 Kenny G – soprano saxophone, arrangements
 Peabo Bryson – lead vocals
 Walter Afanasieff – keyboards, synth bass, drums, rhythm programming, all other instruments, arrangements
 Dan Shea – keyboards, programming
 Gary Cirimelli – Macintosh programming, Synclavier programming
 Ren Klyce – Akai AX60 programming, Synclavier programming
 Michael Thompson – guitars
 Lynn Davis – backing vocals
 Jim Gilstrap – backing vocals
 Portia Griffin – backing vocals
 Pat Hawk – backing vocals
 Phillip Ingram – backing vocals
 Vann Johnson – backing vocals
 Rose Stone – backing vocals
 Fred White – backing vocals

Production
 Producers – Walter Afanasieff and David Foster
 Engineer – Dana Jon Chappelle
 Assistant Engineers – Steve Shepherd and Kevin Becka
 Additional Engineering – David Gleeson, Jeffrey Woodruff, Kevin Becka and Steve Shepherd.
 Mixed by Mick Guzauski

Charts

Weekly charts

Year-end charts

Release history

References

1993 singles
1993 songs
Arista Records singles
Kenny G songs
Peabo Bryson songs
Song recordings produced by David Foster
Song recordings produced by Walter Afanasieff
Songs written by Andy Goldmark
Songs written by Diane Warren
Songs written by Michael Bolton